Abui is a non-Austronesian language of the Alor Archipelago. It is spoken in the central part of Alor Island in Eastern Indonesia, East Nusa Tenggara (NTT) province by the Abui people. The native name in the Takalelang dialect is Abui tanga which literally translates as 'mountain language'.

Classification
Abui is a member of the Alor–Pantar languages, within the Timor–Alor–Pantar language family. Based on shared phonological consonant innovations, Abui is part of the Alor subgroup along with Blagar, Adang, Klon, Kui, Kamang, Sawila, and Wersing. Contrary to earlier claims, there is still no conclusive evidence linking the Timor-Alor-Pantar languages to the Trans-New-Guinea family.

History
The Alor-Pantar languages are, at the most, ~3,000 years old.

It appears as though Proto-AP speakers borrowed certain Austronesian words prior to the breakup of Proto-AP; these loan words underwent regular sound change and can therefore be reconstructed for Proto-AP.

Geographic distribution
Abui is spoken by approximately 16,000 speakers in the central part of the Alor Island in Eastern Indonesia, East Nusa Tenggara (NTT) province.

Internal variation
Abui has a number of dialects: Northern, Southern and Western. Northern dialects spoken around villages of Mainang, Masape, Takalelang and Atimelang have been subject of linguistic study.
Southern dialects are spoken around Kelaisi and Apui; western dialects are spoken around Mataru, Fanating and Moru. These dialects remain unstudied.

Phonology
Abui has a relatively simple phonemic inventory with 16 native and 3 loan consonants. There are 5 short vowels each of them having a long counterpart. In a number of cases lexical tone is found. All information in this section is from Kratochvíl 2007.

Consonants

The consonants /cç/, /ɟʝ/, and /g/ are non-native, having been borrowed from Malay in recent decades. As indicated by the chart above, Abui has /r/ and /l/ as separate phonemes.

Vowels

Monophthongs

Diphthongs

Grammar 
Abui is a head-marking language; pronominal prefixes mark the possessors on nouns and undergoer arguments on verbs. Nominal morphology is restricted to possessor inflection; number, case and gender inflections do not appear. Verbal morphology is elaborate including person and aspect inflection. Verb compounding and serialization are common.

Lexical categories
All information in this section is from Kratochvíl 2007.

Open classes in Abui are nouns and verbs. Closed classes are adjectives, deictics, quantifiers, aspectual markers, linkers, adverbs, and question words.

Of these word classes, only verbs and nouns can combine with pronominal prefixes. Only verbs take one of the set of pronominal prefixes (type ), and only verbs combine with aspectual suffixes. Some stems can serve as both nouns and verbs, like tur 'spoon/scoop' below.

tur as a noun:

tur as a verb:

Unlike other verbs, stative verbs don’t require the intersective linker ba when they modify a noun.

Abui has a small class of adjectives. Adjectives can modify NPs but they can't head a VP. Stative verbs, on the other hand, can both modify NPs and serve as predicates. In order for an adjectival stem to be used predicatively, the addition of the generic verb -i is required. Compare the adjective akan ‘black’, with the stative verb fing 'be eldest', below.

akan as NP modifier:

akan-i as predicate:

fing as NP modifier:

fing as predicate:

Morphology
Abui is agglutinating and polysynthetic.
Nouns are usually morphologically simple, while verbs can have affixes indicating person and aspect. Verb roots also combine with each other.
Some words are monomorphemic, consisting of one free root, such as nee 'eat.' Others are more morphologically complex:

prefix-bound.root-bound.root-suffix ha-bek-d-i 'got it broken'

prefix-free.root-bound.root-suffix ha-bui-d-a 'get it shortened'

Morphosyntactic alignment
Abui has a semantic alignment driven by the semantic features of the participants. A language with such a 'fluid alignment' is often referred to as an active–stative language. In semantic alignment, instigating, controlling and volitional participants are realized as the A argument in both transitive and intransitive construction. In Abui, they are expressed with NPs and free pronouns. The affected participants are realized as the U argument. U arguments are expressed by NPs and pronominal prefixes on the verb. There are three types of pronominal prefixes distinguishing the following types of U arguments: patients (PAT), recipients or goals (REC), and benefactives or locations (LOC).

Noun phrase structure
Abui syntax is characterized by strict constituent order. In an NP, the modifiers follow the head noun with the exception of deictic demonstratives and possessors. The NP template is given in below:

NP template: DEMs/NMCs	(POSS-) N	N/ADJ/V/QUANT  ba + NMC	DEMa

The deictic demonstrative indicates the spatial location of the referent and together with the possessor marking precede the head (N). Adjectives (A), stative verbs (V) and quantifiers (QUANT) follow the head. The final constituent of an NP is usually an anaphoric demonstrative (DEMa) that indicates the ‘discourse location’ of the referent. Noun-modifying clauses (NMC) normally occur following the head linked with ba. However, a NMC elaborating on the location of the referent (NMCs) occurs in the same position as the deictic demonstrative, preceding the head noun.

Clause structure
In a clause, the arguments always precede the predicate. The constituent order is strict; the clause template is given below.

Clause template: ADV	NP PROA 	ADV/DEMs 	NPU 		VP 		NEG		DEMt

Note that the deictic demonstrative (DEMs) indicating the spatial location of the event always precedes the predicate. The demonstrative (DEMt) indicating the temporal location of an event is the final clause constituent.
The constituent order in the clause is pragmatically motivated, and the prominent arguments that occur in the preceding discourse are omitted. The topical arguments can be left-dislocated. 
In a sentence, the main clause (MC) may contain marking of tense, aspect and mood. In subordinate clauses (SC), the marking of tense, aspect and mood is reduced and shared with the MC. The position of a SC with respect to the MC is determined by its semantic type. SCs specifying the temporal location or other settings of the event expressed in the MC must precede the MC. SCs expressing non-factive complements or purpose follow the MC. In discourse, there is a preference for clause chains, with the final fully inflected MC. In narratives, strategies such as tail-head linkage are relied on. More details can be found in Kratochvíl (2007).

Voice
Abui, like most Papuan languages, lacks an active-passive voice distinction.

Valence
Most verbs can occur in transitive or intransitive constructions. Abui has no ditransitive verbs.

Writing system
Abui orthography is based on Indonesian. Long vowels are spelled as double vowels. High tone is marked
with an acute accent on the vowel, and low tone is marked with a grave one.

Example
Excerpt from moku mayol, a bride price negotiation text

Linguistic situation

Documentation 
The  Abui ethnic group has attracted the attention of foreign researchers since the 1930s. American cultural anthropologist Cora DuBois lived between 1937-1939 in the village of Atimelang. Her research is documented in her monograph 'The  People of Alor'.
Cora DuBois was accompanied by the Dutch sociologist Martha Margaretha Nicolspeyer who conducted a study of the social structure of Abui people.

After World War II, W.A.L. Stokhof and H. Steinhauer conducted a linguistic survey of Alor and Pantar.
Later, W.A.L. Stokhof published and analyzed one of the texts collected by Nicolspeyer.
Linguistic documentation efforts have been undertaken recently by Leiden University. As one of the results of the Alor and Pantar Project, a description of Abui grammar appeared in 2007. More recently a tri-lingual Abui-Indonesian-English dictionary was published in Indonesia. The dictionary was accompanied by a tri-lingual collection of stories from Takalelang and Tifolafeng.

Endangerment and revitalization 

Due to language shift among the young generation, Abui is considered "threatened" and it is being taught as a subject in local schools.

Notes

References

External links 

 
 Abui basic lexicon at the Global Lexicostatistical Database
 Alor–Pantar Languages: Origins and Theorectical impact (hosted by Leiden University)
 Alor–Pantar Languages: Origins and Theorectical impact (EUROBABEL project website)
 Listen to a sample of Abui from Global Recordings Network

Alor–Pantar languages
Languages of Indonesia
Alor Archipelago